Jind Mahi is a 2022 Punjabi romantic drama film, starring Sonam Bajwa and Ajay Sarkaria. Directed by Sameer Pannu, this film has been produced under White Hill Studios and was earlier scheduled to be released in the theatres on 8 July 2022. The film eventually released on 5 August 2022.

Cast

Production
The film was announced in August 2021 after the success of lead pair's 2019 film Ardab Mutiyaran, with the same pair Sonam Bajwa and Ajay Sarkaria. Thus this is the second project where Sonam and Ajay will be seen together on screen. Raj Shoker, from Udaarian song fame is all set to make her acting debut with the film.

Principal photography for the film commenced in September 2021.

Soundtrack

Track list of Jind Mahi

References

External links
 

2022 films
2022 romantic drama films
Indian romantic drama films
Punjabi-language Indian films
Films postponed due to the COVID-19 pandemic